Sharon Lea Anne Anyos (born 13 October 1970, Geelong, Victoria, Australia) is a retired Australian featherweight boxer, kickboxer, karate competitor and model. 

Anyos holds multiple World titles in boxing, including winning the first ever WBC World female featherweight title in 2005 against Marcela Acuña. Anyos successfully defended her World title against Esther Schouten in 2006. Anyos was awarded the WBC World Emeritus title in 2007, alongside other boxing legends including Kostya Tszyu, Vitali Klitschko, Lennox Lewis, Bernard Hopkins, Floyd Mayweather, Érik Morales and Laila Ali.

Championships and awards

Boxing
Australian female lightweight title (126¼Ibs)
Oceania Boxing Association female super lightweight (135Ibs)
Oceania Boxing Association female welterweight (138¾Ibs)
Women's International Boxing Association World featherweight title (125¼Ibs)
International Boxing Association female featherweight title (125¼Ibs)
World Boxing Foundation female featherweight title (125Ibs)
WBC World female featherweight title (123½Ibs)
WBC World Emeritus female featherweight title

Professional boxing record

References

External links
 
 

1970 births
Living people
Australian women boxers
Australian female kickboxers
World featherweight boxing champions
International Boxing Federation champions
World Boxing Council champions
Sportspeople from the Gold Coast, Queensland
Sportswomen from Queensland
Australian female karateka
Australian female models
Female Muay Thai practitioners
Australian Muay Thai practitioners